Elena Baltacha was the defending champion, having won the event in 2013, but retired at the end of the season and died in May 2014 of liver cancer.

Jarmila Gajdošová won the title, defeating Timea Bacsinszky in the final, 6–2, 6–2.

Seeds

Main draw

Finals

Top half

Bottom half

References

External links 
 Main draw

Nottingham Challenge - Women's Singles
Nottingham Challenge